Pune railway division is one of the five railway divisions of Central Railway (India) Zone of Indian Railways located at Pune of Maharashtra state in western India. The other railway divisions are Mumbai CSMT,  Nagpur, Solapur and Bhusawal. There are 71 railway stations in Pune railway division.
station will now be a part of pune Railway division. 24 stations of Daund-Enkai section will be merged with Pune Railway division. Currently Daund-Ankai section is under solapur railway division. Merging with Pune division will increase the chances of starting DEMU services between Ahmednagar and Pune railway station.

Background
Pune Division includes four districts of the state of Maharashtra which are Pune, Satara, Sangli and Kolhapur. The division includes one A1 class railway station, three A class stations, 1 B class station, 14 C class stations, 10 D class stations, 31 E class stations and 12 F class stations which makes a total of 71 railway stations in the division.

History
Ministry of Railways decided on formation of a new Railway Division at Pune on 10 January 1996.  The foundation stone laying ceremony for the new division was held on 13 January 1996. Initially the Division was started with jurisdiction over Lonavala-Pune section only. With effect from 1 April 2003. Pune–Daund–Baramati section excluding Daund and Pune –Miraj –KOP section were added which increased the jurisdiction to 503.39. route-km.

Part of DRM office is functioning from campus of IRICEN and remaining offices are housed in a portion of Goods Shed, having entry from Ambedkar Marg. The Phase I of New DRM Office building is under construction and is expected to be ready by middle of this year.

Division has 71 stations out of which Pune is categorized as A1 station & Miraj and Kolhapur are categorized as A stations.

Twenty-four stations of daund-Ankai section will be merged with Pune railway division. Currently Daund-Ankai section is under solapur railway division. Merging with pune division will incarese the chances of starting demu services between Ahmednagar and pune railway station.

Ticketing 
Pune railway division dealt with 3.35 crores of suburban and 3.63 crores of non-suburban originating passengers annually.

Passenger Reservation System (PRS) facilities are available at Pune junction plus 4 Cyber Booking Offices (CBOs) in Pune City i.e. Deccan Gymkhana, Shankarseth Road, Raviwar Peth & Pune Cant. PRS facilities are also available at Khadki, Chinchwad, Miraj, Kolhapur, Satara, Sangli, Karad, Baramati. Two more PRS centres operated by Defence personnel are functioning at Khadki Cantt. & Dehu Road. PRS at Ichalkaranji post office is being operated by their staff.

Pune railway division has the distinction of being the first railway division to complete the installation of all UTS & UTS cum PRS locations. At present division has total 59 UTS (Unreserved Ticketing System) of which 12 are UTS cum PRS locations.

Goods traffic
POL, sugar, maize and motor vehicles constitute as major components of outward goods traffic. POL is loaded from LONI.Sugar from Gurmarket, Sangli, Karad, Baramati, Satara, Miraj and motor vehicles from Chinchwad.Approximately 600 rakes/year of outward traffic is handled on Pune Division.

Nearly 2000 Rakes/year of inward traffic is received and handled on Pune division. Cement and steel are received at Pune, Khadki, Loni, Saswad.Fertilizers, food grains are received at Miraj, Sangli, Saswad and Satara. POL loaded from Loni and other location is received at Miraj and Bhilvadi.

Connections
It connects other railway division of central Railway Zone as
Lonavala (exclude)-Pune Junction-Daund Junction (exclude)
Pune Junction - Satara - Sangli - Miraj Jn - Kolhapur
Daund Junction (exclude) - Baramati station will now be a part of Pune railway division. Twenty-four stations of Daund-Ankai section will be merged with Pune railway division. Currently Daund-Ankai section is under Solapur railway division. Merging with Pune division will increase the chances of starting DEMU services between Ahmednagar and Pune railway station.

Lonand Junction - Phaltan

Junction Stations and their routes
The Junction railway stations in the Pune railway divisions are Pune Junction and Miraj Junction.

Daund Junction railway station is not under Pune division (Exclude), but is under Solapur railway division.

The only terminal station in the division is Kolhapur as Chattrapati Shahu Maharaj Terminus.

List of railway stations and towns 
Division has 71 stations out of which Pune is categorized as A1 station. Sangli, Miraj and Kolhapur are categorized as A stations. The list includes the stations  under the Pune division and their station category.

Railway line and en route stations 
There are four main lines in this railway subdivision and two branch lines.

The railway line en route station details are as follows

Pune-Lonavala
Pune Jn-Lonavala (Exclude)
The total length of this section is 63.83 Kilometers, which includes a total of 18 stations. Out of the 18 stations, there are 11 B class, a C class, 4 D class and 2 SPL class stations. The line includes a Double Line system, with traction of AC Electrification.

The system of working is Absolute Block System.

The maximum Permissible Speed are given below,
 Mail/EXP Trains   - 105 km/h
 Passenger Trains  - 105 km/h
 EMU Locals        - 80 km/h
 Goods Trains      - 75 km/h

En route station details-

Pune Junction,  and (exclude)

Pune-Daund
Pune Jn - Daund Jn (Exclude)
The total length of this section is 75.59 Kilometers, which includes a total of 11 stations. Out of the 11 stations, there are 7 B class, no C class, 3 D class and 1 SPL class stations. The line includes a Double Line system, with traction of Electric. The electrification of the line was completed in October 2016.

The system of working is Absolute Block System.

The maximum Permissible Speed are given below,
 Mail/EXP Trains   - 105 km/h
 Passenger Trains  - 105 km/h
 Goods Trains      - 75 km/h
Enroute station details- Pune Junction, Hadapsar, Manjari Budruk, Loni, Uruli, Yavat, Khutbav,  Kedgaon, Kadethan, Patas and Daund Junction.

Daund-Baramati
Daund Jn (Exclude) - Baramati 
The total length of this section is 43.70 Kilometers, which includes a total of 6 stations. Out of the 6 stations, there are 1 B class, no C class, 4 D class and 1 SPL class stations. The line includes a Single Line system, with traction of Diesel.

The system of working is One Train Only System.

The maximum Permissible Speed are given below,
 Mail/EXP Trains   - 60 km/h
 Passenger Trains  - 60 km/h
 Goods Trains      - 40 km/h
En route station details- Daund Junction, Maladgaon, Shirsai, Sirsuphal, Katphal and Baramati.

 
This railway line may straight connectivity to Manmad to Sangli and South India .. Via connection of Ahmadnagar Baramati Phaltan Vita Tasgoan and Sangli

Baramati-Lonand
Baramati - Lonand Jn 
The total length of this section is 53.038 Kilometers, which includes a total of 6 stations. Out of the 6 stations, there are 1 B class, no C class, 4 D class and 1 SPL class stations. The line includes a Single Line system, with traction of Diesel. The section meets the Pune-Miraj Section at Lonand Jn. The rail link from Lonand Jn to Phaltan was completed in 2011 but there is absolute no progress in rail link construction for the remainder section i.e. from Phaltan to Baramati. So this section is incomplete.

The system of working is One Train Only System.

The maximum Permissible Speed are given below,
 Mail/EXP Trains   - 60 km/h
 Passenger Trains  - 60 km/h
 Goods Trains      - 40 km/h
En route station details- Baramati, Sangawi, Phaltan, Nimbore, Taradgaon and Lonanad Jn.

Pune-Miraj
Pune–Miraj–Londa line 
The total length of this section is 279.05 Kilometers, which includes a total of 36 stations. Out of the 36 stations, there are 30 B class, no C class, 4 D class and 2 SPL class stations. The line includes a Single Line system, with traction of Diesel. The section meets the Baramati-Lonand Section at Lonand Jn.

The system of working is Absolute Block System.

The maximum Permissible Speed are given below,
 Mail/EXP Trains   - 100 km/h
 Passenger Trains  - 100 km/h
 Goods Trains      - 75 km/h

En route station details- Pune Jn - Ghorpadi - Alandi - Jejuri - Lonand Jn - Satara - Sangli - Miraj Jn

Miraj-Kolhapur
Miraj Jn - Chattrapati Shahu Maharaj Terminus 
The total length of this section is 47.10 Kilometers, which includes a total of 8 stations. Out of the 8 stations, there are 2 B class, no C class, 4 D class and 2 SPL class stations. The line includes a Single Line system, with traction of Diesel.

The system of working is Absolute Block System.

The maximum Permissible Speed are given below,
 Mail/EXP Trains   - 100 km/h
 Passenger Trains  - 100 km/h
 Goods Trains      - 75 km/h
En route station details- Miraj, Jaysingpur, Nimshirgaon Tamdalge, Hatkanangale, Rukadi, Valivade, Gurumarket and Kolhapur.

Diesel Loco Shed
Diesel Loco Shed, Pune is an engine shed located in Pune, Maharashtra in India. It is located east of Pune Junction, falling under Pune Railway Division. Of the three diesel loco sheds in the Central Railway zone, this is the largest among them followed by Kurla and Kalyan.

References

External links 

 

Divisions of Indian Railways
2003 establishments in Maharashtra